is a Japanese professional football club based in Hakata, Fukuoka. They currently competing in the J1 League, which is the top tier of football in the country.

History
"Avispa" means "wasp" in Spanish. They were originally called Fujieda Blux and based in Fujieda, Shizuoka before moving to Fukuoka in 1994. After becoming the champions of 1995 Japan Football League as Fukuoka Blux, and being admitted to the J.League since 1996 season, Avispa Fukuoka has the longest history as a J.League club being uncrowned in any nationwide competitions such as J.League Division 1, Division 2, J.League Cup, or Emperor's Cup.

In Fujieda
The club was founded as Chūō Bōhan SC in 1982 by the workers of security company Chuo Bohan in Fujieda, Shizuoka. They were promoted to the Japan Soccer League Division 2 in 1991. They participated in the newly founded former Japan Football League Division 2 in 1992 and were promoted to Division 1 in 1993. They changed their name to Fujieda Blux with intention to be a J.League member. However, with difficulties to have a stadium that met J.League requirements, and with local competition from Júbilo Iwata and Shimizu S-Pulse, the football fan base in Shizuoka prefecture was already considered saturated. As a result, in 1994 they decided to move to Fukuoka where the community was eager to have a J.League club. They adopted new name Fukuoka Blux and became a J.League associate member. Amateur club Chūō Bōhan F.C. was active in Fujieda until 2006.

1995 (JFL)
The first season in Fukuoka saw them win the JFL championship with help from Argentine Hugo Maradona and they were promoted to J.League.

1996–1998 (J.League)
They decided to change their name to Avispa Fukuoka to avoid a potential trademark dispute with men's clothier Brooks Brothers. The club acquired experienced players such as former Japanese international Satoshi Tsunami and defender Hideaki Mori but they finished lowly 15th in the 1996 season. They finished bottom of the league two seasons in a row from 1997 to 1998. At the end of the 1998 season, Avispa were involved in the play-offs but they narrowly escaped a relegation. Around this time, forward Yoshiteru Yamashita and midfielder Chikara Fujimoto were chosen for the Japanese national team.

Note: No team was relegated from J.League until 1998. With a view to the foundation of J.League Division 2 in 1999, the relegation/promotion play-offs were held in 1998 for the first time.

1999–2001 (J1)
In 1999, they again reinforced the squad by acquiring experienced players such as former internationals Nobuyuki Kojima and Yasutoshi Miura as well as Yugoslavian Nenad Maslovar. They won a fierce relegation battle and eventually stayed up. In 2000, Argentine David Bisconti and Romanian Pavel Badea were transferred to Fukuoka and they finished club record 6th in the second stage. In 2001, the club acquired former Korean international Noh Jung-Yoon and Yoshika Matsubara but they finished 15th and were relegated to J2.

2002–2005 (J2)
In 2002, they kept experienced players and released younger players such as Daisuke Nakaharai and Yoshiteru Yamashita but they finished 8th out of 10. In 2002, with new manager Hiroshi Matsuda, they decided to recruit and nurture young players who graduated from local high schools instead of acquiring experienced footballers from other clubs. They initially struggled but came back well and finished 4th. In 2004, they finished 3rd and qualified for the play-offs but Kashiwa Reysol dashed their promotion hope by beating them home and away (the scoreline was both 2–0). In 2005, they finished 2nd and gained an automatic promotion to J1. Avispa players Hokuto Nakamura and Tomokazu Nagira represented Japan for the 2005 World Youth Championship in the Netherlands.

2006 (J1)
They had been involved in a relegation battle from the beginning of the season. They finished 16th and were relegated to J2 after the promotion/relegation play-offs against Vissel Kobe, which they tied twice, 0–0 in Kobe, then 1–1 at their home game. Like many J2 teams this has led to financial issues. The Daily Yomiuri reported that in 2006 Avispa needed 535 million yen in loans from the local prefectural and municipal governments.

2007–2008 (J2)
With relegation came another new manager, the former German international Pierre Littbarski. "Litti" arrived from the Australian A-League, bringing with him several experienced players such as Mark Rudan, Joel Griffiths and Ufuk Talay, but he was unable to steer Avispa to any notable success. Having finished 7th in 2007, an inability to compete near the top of the league led to Littbarski's sacking in mid-2008. He was replaced by former Avispa player Yoshiyuki Shinoda.

2009 (J2)
The departure of Littbarski coincided with the departure of the club's Australian players, who were largely replaced with youngsters from a number of Kyushu-based universities. After a reasonable start, Avispa's form has tailed off sharply, with a recent five-game losing streak including 6–0 and 5–0 thrashings away at Ventforet Kofu and Mito HollyHock respectively. The club finished in the lower half of the J2 table with promotion hopes dashed for another year.

2010 (J2)
Yoshiyuki Shinoda bolstered his squad for the 2010 season by adding more players from local University teams, and picked up midfielders Kosuke Nakamachi and Genki Nagasato who had previously played together at Shonan Bellmare.
The season started slowly with the team picking up only 1 point out of a possible 15 in March, but then saw a dramatic improvement in performance as they went on to win 17 of the next 25 games including a come from behind victory against promotion rivals JEF United. As JEF United went on to drop more points Avispa secured promotion back to J1 with 2 games of the season left to play.

Popular striker Tetsuya Okubo was released at the end of the season, along with 4 other players as the squad was prepared for J1.

2011 (J1)
The promotion to J1 saw some significant changes to the squad as Takuya Matsuura was brought in to replace Genki Nagasato who departed to Ventforet Kofu under a cloud, Shogo Kobara, Kim Min-je and Takumi Wada coming in to bolster defence, while Sho Naruoka and Kentaro Shigematsu arrived to try to score the goals to keep the club in the division.

Tipped by all pundits on the J-League After Game Show to finish the season in 18th position, the players struggled to gel and went for the first 13 games of the season without earning a point.
Despite improving slightly towards the mid-season break manager Shinoda left the club to be replaced by head coach Tetsuya Asano.

While results continued to improve, culminating in a 6–0 away win to Montedio Yamagata, the club could not pull themselves out of the relegation zone and finished the season in 17th position to be relegated to J2.
At the end of the season the manager was changed again with Koji Maeda being brought in to replace the departing Asano.

2012 (J2)
The team was looking to bounce straight back to J1 upon their return to the second tier but endured the worst season in the history of the club as they finished a lowly 18th in the table; only winning 9 games all season and conceding 68 goals (only Gainare Tottori would concede more in the season).
The end of the season saw Koji Maeda part ways with the club as they looked to rebuild towards a better 2013.

2013 (J2)
The club returned to hiring a non-Japanese manager for the first time since Pierre Littbarski as Slovenian Marijan Pusnik arrived.
His arrival saw a greater emphasis given towards the development of young players at the club as rookies Yuta Mishima and Takeshi Kanamori were given chances in the first team.

Results on the pitch immediately improved and the club were competing around the play-off positions until a slump in form mid-season coincided with the announcement that the club needed ¥50 million to remain solvent. The club finished in 14th position, but found the money to stay afloat, with Pusnik agreeing to remain as manager for another season.

2014 (J2) 
Avispa finished in 16th place. Pušnik's contract was not renewed and he returned to Slovenia.

2015 (Promotion to J1)
The club hired new coach Masami Ihara who twice handled Kashiwa Reysol in a caretaker capacity. They finished third and were promoted back to J1 in winning the promotion playoffs.

2016 (J1)
Avispa finished in 18th place and relegated to J2. League

2017 (J2)
Avispa finished in fourth place. In the "J1 promotion play-off", Avispa won the semi-final game 1–0 against Tokyo Verdy. In the final game however, the team had a scoreless draw, 0-0, with Nagoya Grampus leaving them in third place, meaning Avispa could not be promoted to J1.

League & cup record

Key

Honours
Japan Football League/J2 League (second tier)
Champions: 1995
Runners-up: 2005, 2020
Japan Football League Division 2 (third tier)
Champions: 1992
All Japan Senior Football Championship:
Champions: 1989, 1990

Current players
.

Out on loan

Reserve squad (U-18s) 
; Squad for the 2022 season.

Club officials
For the 2023 season.

Managerial history

Colour, sponsors and manufacturers

Kit evolution

References

External links
  Avispa Fukuoka Official Site

 
J.League clubs
Japan Soccer League clubs
Football clubs in Japan
Association football clubs established in 1982
Sports teams in Fukuoka, Fukuoka
1982 establishments in Japan
Japan Football League (1992–1998) clubs